Ketereh is a town and parliamentary constituency in Kelantan. It is located in the southern half of Kota Bharu District, roughly halfway between metropolitan Kota Bharu and Machang along Highway 8. The town was named after the local name for the cashew fruit, ketereh (gajus in standard Malay).

Transportation

Rail
KTM Intercity does not stop in Ketereh town. The nearest station is in Pasir Mas.

Government and politics
Ketereh is administered by the Ketereh District Council, which was established on 1 January 1979 as the Kota Bharu District Council, through the merger of the Kadok, Pangkal Kalong and Peringat Local Councils.

In the Malaysian Parliament Ketereh is represented by Tan Sri Annuar Musa.

See also
 Kota Bharu

References

External links
 

Kota Bharu District
Towns in Kelantan